Benjamin Gibson may refer to:

 Ben Gibson (born 1993), English footballer
 Ben Gibson (politician) (1882–1949), American politician and lawyer
 Ben Gibson, illustrator known for work on The Selected Works of T. S. Spivet
 Ben Gibson, photographer known for work on Battle of the Beanfield
 Ben Gibson, fictional character portrayed by Doug Sheehan in Knots Landing
 Benjamin F. Gibson (1931–2021), American judge